Live at the Tractor Tavern is a live country recording by the American rock and roll band Supersuckers. Released in 2004, it was recorded live at The Tractor Tavern, in Seattle, Washington.

Critical reception
Ox-Fanzine wrote that "with 'Creepy eyes' and 'Doublewide' the men move in the meaningless no man's land between rock and country, little inspired, and both styles are just played down superficially." AllMusic wrote : "[Eddie] Spaghetti is your host for the evening, providing wry and rambling song intro commentaries, a get-to-know-the-band session, and a few memorable heckler retorts. The set might have been a bit longer, but other than that there really isn't anything here for Supersuckers devotees to complain about."

Track listing
 "Creepy Jackalope Eye" – 3:40
 "Doublewide" – 2:40
 "Sail On" – 4:12
 "Pretty Fucked Up" – 4:17
 "Killer Weed" – 7:45
 "Born with a Tail" – 8:03
 "Alabama, Louisiana or Maybe Tennessee" – 4:24

Harmonica on the album is played by Dave Lipkind from a Portland, Oregon, band called I Can Lick Any Sonofabitch in the House.

References

Supersuckers albums
2004 live albums